Other Minds may mean:

 Other Minds: The Octopus, the Sea, and the Deep Origins of Consciousness, a 2016 book on octopus intelligence by Peter Godfrey-Smith
 Other Minds (organization), a not-for-profit based in San Francisco

See also
 Context as Other Minds, a 2005 book on human linguistic communication by John Benjamins
 God and Other Minds, a 1967 book on the rationality of religious belief by Alvin Plantinga
 Problem of other minds, a longstanding open problem philosophy